Togiak Lake is a  lake in the U.S. state of Alaska, which extends South-West from mouth of Izavieknik River,  northeast of Goodnews Bay, Kilbuck-Kuskokwim Mountains.

Little Togiak Lake 

Upper Togiak Lake 

See also 
List of lakes of Alaska

References 

Bodies of water of Dillingham Census Area, Alaska
Lakes of Alaska